Stacy Street is a street and surrounding census-designated place (CDP) in Palm Beach County, Florida, United States. The population was 978 at the 2020 census, which misspelled it as Stacey Street.

Geography
Palm Beach County Parks and Recreation's Stacy Street Park is located at the Haverhill Road intersection, and Hope-Centennial Elementary School is near the west end.

The CDP is located at  (26.699083, -80.126016).

According to the United States Census Bureau, the CDP has a total area of 0.3 km (0.1 mi2), all land.

Demographics

2020 census

Note: the US Census treats Hispanic/Latino as an ethnic category. This table excludes Latinos from the racial categories and assigns them to a separate category. Hispanics/Latinos can be of any race.

As of the census of 2000, there were 958 people, 258 households, and 199 families residing in the CDP.  The population density was 3,362.6/km (8,354.6/mi2).  There were 267 housing units at an average density of 937.2/km (2,328.5/mi2).  The racial makeup of the CDP was 43.01% White (14.6% were Non-Hispanic White,) 50.52% African American, 0.63% Asian, 2.61% from other races, and 3.24% from two or more races. Hispanic or Latino of any race were 33.92% of the population.

There were 258 households, out of which 56.2% had children under the age of 18 living with them, 34.5% were married couples living together, 34.9% had a female householder with no husband present, and 22.5% were non-families. 9.7% of all households were made up of individuals, and 0.4% had someone living alone who was 65 years of age or older.  The average household size was 3.62 and the average family size was 3.79.

In the CDP, the population was spread out, with 39.2% under the age of 18, 13.4% from 18 to 24, 33.8% from 25 to 44, 10.3% from 45 to 64, and 3.2% who were 65 years of age or older.  The median age was 23 years. For every 100 females, there were 111.5 males.  For every 100 females age 18 and over, there were 106.4 males.

The median income for a household in the CDP was $25,950, and the median income for a family was $26,250. Males had a median income of $19,091 versus $19,597 for females. The per capita income for the CDP was $10,449.  About 28.8% of families and 35.1% of the population were below the poverty line, including 38.8% of those under age 18 and none of those age 65 or over.

As of 2000, English was the first language for 52.89% of all residents, while Spanish made up 43.01%, and French Creole was the mother tongue for 4.09% of the population.

References

Census-designated places in Palm Beach County, Florida
Census-designated places in Florida